Johan Thorbjørnsen (born 19 August 1983) is a Norwegian former football goalkeeper.

Career
Born in Bergen, he became Norwegian U20 champion with Brann's junior team in 2002. Thorbjørnsen debuted in Tippeligaen on 11 April 2005 against Molde  where he kept a clean sheet. During his years in Brann Thorbjørnsen was the second-choice goalkeeper, usually playing in the first rounds of the Norwegian football cup and whenever Håkon Opdal was injured. In 2007 he played three matches when Brann won Tippeligaen.

He was loaned out to Sandefjord in 2008, but experienced some cardiac problems. In 2009, he was only the third choice goalkeeper behind Håkon Opdal and Kenneth Udjus, and expressed a desire to leave Brann.

On 21 November 2009 he signed for Løv-Ham, where he played for two seasons before he ahead of the 2012-season was one of the first players to sign for the new second division club from Bergen, Fyllingsdalen.

Honours

Norway
Tippeligaen: 2007

Career statistics

Source:

References

1983 births
Living people
Norwegian footballers
Løv-Ham Fotball players
Sandefjord Fotball players
SK Brann players
Footballers from Bergen
Eliteserien players
Association football goalkeepers